Paul Wheatcroft (born 22 November 1980) is an English footballer who played as a forward. He started his career as a youth at Manchester United before joining Bolton Wanderers in 2000, being loaned out to Rochdale and Mansfield Town. In 2002, he then joined Scunthorpe United before dropping into non-League football with Southport, Stalybridge Celtic and Radcliffe Borough, where he was loaned to with Rossendale United.

Career
Wheatcroft started his career as a trainee at Manchester United, having attended The FA's National School of Excellence in Lilleshall. After a loan spell at South African club FC Fortune, Wheatcroft was released from Manchester United and subsequently signed for Bolton Wanderers. Whilst at Bolton, he had loan spells with Rochdale and Mansfield Town.

He went on to join Scunthorpe United in the summer of 2002, before being released and joining Conference National club Southport in January 2003. Southport manager Phil Wilson stated that; "Paul has a good pedigree, having played for Manchester United and Bolton and we are hoping he can kick-start his career."

Wheatcroft then had a spell at Oldham Athletic, having been offered non-contract terms, but was released due to the club's poor financial situation. He went on to join Stalybridge Celtic in September 2003.

In January 2004, Wheatcroft then joined Northern Premier League Premier Division club Radcliffe Borough alongside defender, Terry Bowker. On signing for Radcliffe, his manager Kevin Glendon said; "Paul has an excellent pedigree and at still only 23 has crammed a lot of football experience into such a short space of time." In March 2004, he was loaned out to Northern Premier League First Division club Rossendale United.

In 2023, Paul made his debut for Salboy FC. Unfortunately, he was subbed off injured in the sixth minute.

References

External links

1980 births
Living people
Footballers from Manchester
English footballers
Association football forwards
Manchester United F.C. players
Western Province United F.C. players
Bolton Wanderers F.C. players
Rochdale A.F.C. players
Mansfield Town F.C. players
Scunthorpe United F.C. players
Southport F.C. players
Oldham Athletic A.F.C. players
Stalybridge Celtic F.C. players
Radcliffe F.C. players
Rossendale United F.C. players
English Football League players
National League (English football) players
Northern Premier League players